Tillandsia suescana is a species of flowering plant in the genus Tillandsia. This species is native to Venezuela.

References

suescana
Flora of Venezuela